Sharon Brous (born 1973) is an American rabbi who currently serves as the senior rabbi of IKAR, a Jewish congregation in Los Angeles. She was one of the founders of IKAR in 2004, along with Melissa Balaban, who currently serves as IKAR's Chief Executive Officer, and others. Every year since its founding, IKAR has been named one of the nation’s 50 most innovative Jewish nonprofits by the Slingshot Fund Guide, a resource guide for Jewish innovation. Her forthcoming book, THE AMEN EFFECT, will be available for pre-order spring of 2023.

Biography
In 2013, The Daily Beast listed Brous as #1 on its list of America's most influential rabbis; she ranked #5 on the same list in 2012. The publication wrote that "Ikar, the come-as-you-are spiritual community that Brous, 39, founded nearly a decade ago, has become a magnet for L.A.’s young, unaffiliated Jews" in a time when many synagogues face "disaffected, declining membership."

In 2006, the Forward cited her as among the 50 most influential American Jews. In 2013 she blessed President Obama and Vice President Biden at the Inaugural National Prayer Service, and blessed LA Mayor Eric Garcetti at his inauguration in 2017. She sits on the faculty of the Hartman Institute-North America, Wexner Foundation's Wexner Heritage; and REBOOT, and is a Senior Fellow at Auburn Theological Seminary. She serves on the International Council of the New Israel Fund and rabbinic advisory council to American Jewish World Service.

Brous was ordained by the Jewish Theological Seminary in 2001 and received a master's degree in human rights from Columbia University, where she also received her bachelor's degree in 1995. Before moving to Los Angeles, she served as a Rabbinic Fellow at Congregation B’nai Jeshurun in New York City.

In January 2016, Brous and colleagues from six other Jewish communities from across the United States officially announced the launch of the Jewish Emergent Network, a collaboration between IKAR and Kavana in Seattle, The Kitchen in San Francisco, Mishkan in Chicago, Sixth & I in Washington, D.C., and Lab/Shul and Romemu in New York City. All seven communities have individually received recognition for the impact of their work in the Jewish community on both a local and national scale.

In 2018 Brous, among others, was on the cover of Time; the cover was based on a 1943 Norman Rockwell painting titled “Freedom of Worship.”

Brous is known for her strong political stances, and has asserted that "There’s no such thing as decoupling religion and politics."  She studies Talmud with LA Mayor Eric Garcetti twice a week, and Mayor Garcetti has stated that he is in touch with her daily. Brous has also hosted Mayor Garcetti at her Jewish High Holidays events for multiple years running.

Brous has contributed to the books The Modern Jewish Girl's Guide to Guilt, A dream of Zion: American Jews reflect on why Israel matters to them, and The Women's Torah Commentary: New Insights from Women Rabbis on the 54 Weekly Torah Portions.

The art exhibit “Holy Sparks”, which opened in February 2022 at the Heller Museum and the Skirball Museum, featured 24 Jewish women artists, who had each created an artwork about a female rabbi who was a first in some way. Penny Wolin created the artwork about Brous.

References

External links
 IKAR Official Website

1973 births
Living people
Women rabbis
21st-century American rabbis
Columbia College (New York) alumni